Cajuata Municipality is the third municipal section of the Inquisivi Province in the  La Paz Department, Bolivia. Its headquarters is in Cajuata.

References 

 Instituto Nacional de Estadistica de Bolivia

Municipalities of La Paz Department (Bolivia)